The International Women of Courage Award, also referred to as the U.S. Secretary of State's International Women of Courage Award, is an American award presented annually by the United States Department of State to women around the world who have shown leadership, courage, resourcefulness, and willingness to sacrifice for others, especially in promoting women's rights.

History
The award was established in 2007 by U.S. Secretary of State Condoleezza Rice on or near the International Women's Day, an annual celebration observed each March 8 in many countries worldwide. Each U.S. embassy has the right to recommend one woman as a candidate. As of 2021, the award has been given to over 155 recipients from about 75 different countries.

Award recipients by year

2007 

Ruth Halperin-Kaddari of Israel
Jennifer Louise Williams of Zimbabwe
Siti Musdah Mulia of Indonesia
Ilze Jaunalksne of Latvia
Samia al-Amoudi of Saudi Arabia
Mariya Ahmed Didi of the Maldives
Susana Trimarco de Veron of Argentina
Aziza Siddiqui of Afghanistan
Sundus Abbas of Iraq
Shatha Abdul Razzak Abbousi of Iraq
Mary Akrami of Afghanistan
Grace Padaca of the Philippines

2008 

 Suraya Pakzad of Afghanistan
Virisila Buadromo of Fiji
Eaman al-Gobory of Iraq
Valdete Idrizi of Kosovo
Begum Jan of Pakistan
Nibal Thawabteh of the Palestinian Authority
Cynthia Bendlin of Paraguay
Farhiyo Farah Ibrahim of Somalia

2009 

 Mutabar Tadjibayeva of Uzbekistan
 Ambiga Sreenevasan of Malaysia
 Wazhma Frogh of Afghanistan
 Norma Cruz of Guatemala
 Suaad Allami of Iraq
 Hadizatou Mani of Niger
 Veronika Marchenko of Russia
 Reem Al Numery of Yemen

2010 

Shukria Asil of Afghanistan
Shafiqa Quraishi of Afghanistan
Androula Henriques of Cyprus
Sonia Pierre of the Dominican Republic
Shadi Sadr of Iran
Ann Njogu  of Kenya
Lee Ae-ran of South Korea
Jansila Majeed of Sri Lanka
Marie Claude Naddaf of Syria
Jestina Mukoko of Zimbabwe

Alice Mabota was given the award but she is not in the official list.

2011 

 Maria Bashir of Afghanistan
 Henriette Ekwe Ebongo of Cameroon
 Guo Jianmei of China
 Eva Abu Halaweh of Jordan
 Marisela Morales Ibañez of Mexico
 Ágnes Osztolykán of Hungary
 Roza Otunbayeva of the Kyrgyz Republic
 Ghulam Sughra of Pakistan
 Yoani Sanchez of Cuba
 Nasta Palazhanka of Belarus
 Pionie Boso of the Solomon Islands

2012 

 Aneesa Ahmed of the Maldives
 Zin Mar Aung of Burma
 Samar Badawi of Saudi Arabia
 Shad Begum of Pakistan
 Maryam Durani of Afghanistan
 Pricilla de Oliveira Azevedo of Brazil
 Hana Elhebshi of Libya
 Jineth Bedoya Lima of Colombia
 Şafak Pavey of Turkey
 Hawa Abdallah Mohammed Salih of Sudan 
 Gabi Calleja of Malta

2013 

Malalai Bahaduri of Afghanistan
Tsering Woeser of China
Julieta Castellanos of Honduras
Nirbhaya "Fearless" of India
Josephine Obiajulu Odumakin of Nigeria
Elena Milashina of Russia
Fartuun Adan of Somalia
Razan Zeitouneh of Syria
Ta Phong Tan of Vietnam

2014 

Nasrin Oryakhil of Afghanistan
Roshika Deo of Fiji
Rusudan Gotsiridze of Georgia
Iris Yassmin Barrios Aguilar of Guatemala
Laxmi of India
Fatimata Touré of Mali
Maha Al Muneef of Saudi Arabia
Oinikhol Bobonazarova of Tajikistan
Ruslana Lyzhychko of Ukraine
Beatrice Mtetwa of Zimbabwe

2015 

Niloofar Rahmani of Afghanistan
Nadia Sharmeen of Bangladesh
Rosa Julieta Montaño Salvatierra of Bolivia
May Sabe Phyu of Burma
Emilie Béatrice Epaye of the Central African Republic
Marie Claire Tchecola of Guinea
Sayaka Osakabe of Japan
Arbana Xharra of Kosovo
Tabassum Adnan of Pakistan
Majd Izzat al-Chourbaji of Syria

2016 

Sara Hossain of Bangladesh
Debra Baptist-Estrada of Belize
Ni Yulan of China
Latifa Ibn Ziaten of France
Thelma Aldana of Guatemala
Nagham Nawzat of Iraq
Nisha Ayub of Malaysia
Fatimata M’baye of Mauritania
Zhanna Nemtsova of Russia
Zuzana Števulová of Slovakia
Awadeya Mahmoud of Sudan
Vicky Ntetema of Tanzania
Rodjaraeg Wattanapanit of Thailand
Nihal Naj Ali Al-Awlaqi of Yemen

2017 
2017 awards were awarded to:
Sharmin Akter, activist on early/forced marriage, Bangladesh
Malebogo Molefhe, human rights activist, Botswana
Natalia Ponce de Leon, president of the Natalia Ponce de Leon Foundation, Colombia
Rebecca Kabugho, political and social activist, Democratic Republic of Congo
Jannat Al Ghezi, deputy director of the Organization of Women's Freedom in Iraq
 Major Aichatou Ousmane Issaka, deputy director of social work at the Military Hospital of Niamey, Niger
Veronica Simogun, founder and director of the Family for Change Association, Papua New Guinea
Cindy Arlette Contreras Bautista, lawyer and icon of Not One Woman Less, Peru
Sandya Eknelygoda, human rights activist, Sri Lanka
Sister Carolin Tahhan Fachakh, nun and member of the Daughters of Mary Help of Christians (F.M.A.), Syria
Saadet Ozkan, educator and gender activist, Turkey
Nguyen Ngoc Nhu Quynh (Mother Mushroom), blogger and environmental activist, Vietnam
Fadia Najeeb Thabet, human rights activist, Yemen

2018 
2018 awards were awarded to:
Roya Sadat of Afghanistan
Aura Elena Farfan of Guatemala
Dr. Julissa Villanueva of Honduras
Aliyah Khalaf Saleh of Iraq
Sister Maria Elena Berini of Italy (nominated by the U.S. Embassy to the Holy See)
Aiman Umarova of Kazakhstan
Dr. Feride Rushiti of Kosovo
L’Malouma Said of Mauritania
Godeliève Mukasarasi of Rwanda
Sirikan Charoensiri of Thailand

2019 

2019 awards were awarded to:
Marini De Livera of Sri Lanka
 Razia Sultana (Bangladesh)
 Naw K’nyaw Paw (Myanmar)
 Moumina Houssein Darar (Djibouti)
 Maggie Gobran (Egypt)
 Khalida Khalaf Hanna al-Twal (Jordan) 
 Orla Treacy (Republic of Ireland) 
 Olivera Lakić (Montenegro)
 Flor de María Vega Zapata (Peru)
 Anna Aloys Henga (Tanzania)

Note: According to Foreign Policy magazine, an intended award for Jessikka Aro (Finland), announced in January 2019, was withdrawn shortly before the ceremony in March 2019.

2020 
2020 awards were awarded to:
 Zarifa Ghafari (Afghanistan)
 Lucy Kocharyan (Armenia)
 Shahla Humbatova (Azerbaijan)
 Ximena Galarza (Bolivia)
 Claire Ouedraogo (Burkina Faso)
 Sayragul Sauytbay (China)
 Susanna Liew (Malaysia)
 Amaya Coppens (Nicaragua)
 Jalila Haider (Pakistan)
 Amina Khoulani (Syria)
 Yasmin al Qadhi (Yemen)
 Rita Nyampinga (Zimbabwe)

2021 
2021 awards were awarded to:
 Maria Kalesnikava (Belarus)
 Phyoe Phyoe Aung (Burma) (sic)
 Maximilienne C. Ngo Mbe (Cameroon)
 Wang Yu  (China)
 Mayerlis Angarita (Colombia)
 Julienne Lusenge (DRC)
 Erika Aifan (Guatemala)
 Shohreh Bayat (Iran)
 Muskan Khatun (Nepal)
 Zahra Mohamed Ahmad (Somalia)
 Alicia Vacas Moro (Spain)
 Ranitha Gnanarajah (Sri Lanka)
 Canan Gullu (Turkey)
 Ana Rosario Contreras (Venezuela)

2022 
2022 awards were awarded to:
Rizwana Hasan (Bangladesh)
Simone Sibilio do Nascimento (Brazil)
Ei Thinzar Maung (Burma)
Josefina Klinger Zúñiga (Colombia)
Taif Sami Mohammed (Iraq)
Facia Boyenoh Harris (Liberia)
Najla Mangoush (Libya)
Doina Gherman (Moldova)
Bhumika Shrestha (Nepal)
Carmen Gheorghe (Romania)
Roegchanda Pascoe (South Africa)
Phạm Đoan Trang (Vietnam)

2023

The 2023 awards were given to:

  Hadeel Abdel Aziz
  Professor Danièle Darlan
  Brigadier General Bolor Ganbold
  Dr. Zakira Hekmat
  Meaza Mohammed
  Yuliia Paievska
  Senator Datuk Ras Adiba Radzi
  Doris Ríos
  Alba Rueda
  Bakhytzhan Toregozhina
  Bianka Zalewska

An additional Honorary Group Award was given to the "women and girl protestors of Iran" in response to the death of Mahsa Amini and the ongoing protests against the government.

See also

 List of awards honoring women

References

External links

 Secretary's International Women of Courage Award
 2010 International Women of Courage Awards, U.S. State Department photostream on Flickr p
 2011 International Women of Courage Awards, U.S. State Department photostream on Flickr

2007 establishments in Washington, D.C.
Annual events in the United States
Awards established in 2007
Awards honoring women
Civil awards and decorations of the United States
Courage awards
United States Department of State